José Braulio Alemán (26 March 1864 – 15 January 1930, Havana) was a Cuban Brigadier General in the Spanish–American War, promoted to Major General after the war.

General Alemán was the principal author of the Constitution of Cuba proclaimed at La Yara in 1896. This Constitution was used as template for the 1901 Constitution of the new Republic of Cuba.

Biography
A lawyer by profession, owner and journalist of two newspapers at Santa Clara, Cuba in the province of Las Villas, he was incarcerated several times for articles written in favor of Cuba's independence. He was a very prominent and key player in the fight against the Spanish and the eventual liberation of Cuba. Joining the fight for liberation from Spain he was soon promoted from colonel to brigader general. It was General Alemán who served as prosecutor in the famous Morote trial for espionage and treason against the burgeoning republic. General Alemán is fondly and respectfully remembered as the principal author of the Cuban Constitution written at a La Yara while still at arms against the Spanish in 1896. At the end of the war during the American occupation he was one of the very few dignitaries who voted against the unfair and terribly lopsided Platt Amendment.

Promoted to Mayor General after the war, General Alemán served first as Governor and later as Senator for the province of Las Villas. He later became the Minister of Education for the newly established Republic of Cuba. He perhaps was the best Minister of Education Cuba ever produced. As Minister of Education he founded the first Agricultural Schools, the first Institutes of Commerce, the first Sports & Physical Education Institute, and the School of Fine Arts at Santiago de Cuba. He also created the first night schools for adults, the first schools for Languages, and the Technical School of Rancho Boyeros in La Habana, Cuba. He was also instrumental in the partial reorganization of the University of Havana. 
Still later in his political career he was appointed as Ambassador to Mexico where he was recognized for his beliefs in helping the native
Indian poor and downtrodden. 
General  Alemán was a stalwart fighter for equal civil rights for all Cubans and for the right of suffrage. A brilliant statesman he was much admired, widely respected and loved by his contemporaries and the people of Cuba. 
At his passing in 1930 all flags in the nation were flown at half mast and the President of Cuba, all his Cabinet Ministers, several foreign dignitaries and more than 100,000 citizens attended his funeral procession.

Military personnel of the Spanish–American War
1864 births
1930 deaths
Cuban generals
Education ministers of Cuba